Parc des Expositions – Stade Matmut-Atlantique tram stop is a tram stop on line C of the Tramway de Bordeaux. It is located on Cours Charles Bricaud in the north of the city of Bordeaux.

For most of the day on Mondays to Fridays, trams run at least every ten minutes. Services run less frequently in the early morning, late evenings, weekends and public holidays.

The stop has three tracks and three platforms. Although it is the terminus of passenger service on line C, the track continues for some  beyond the stop, to the tram depot at La Jallere.

References

External links 
 

Tram stops in Bordeaux
Bordeaux tramway stops
Railway stations in France opened in 2015